Sakina Itoo (born 5 December 1970) is a Kashmiri politician and the former member of the Jammu and Kashmir Legislative Assembly and Jammu and Kashmir Legislative Council. A member of Jammu and Kashmir National Conference, she represented Noorabad twice in 1996 and 2008. In 1999, she was appointed as a minister for Social Welfare and Administrative Reforms, Inspections, Trainings & Grievances (ARI, Trainings).

The president of National Congress for South Kashmir, she was the only woman to serve in Kashmir's state cabinet ministry in 2008 when Omar Abdullah was incumbent to the post of chief minister.

Biography 
She was born to Wali Mohammad Itoo, speaker of Jammu and Kashmir Legislative Assembly on 5 December 1970 in Kulgam, Jammu and Kashmir. She did her intermediate from the Jammu and Kashmir State Board of School Education in 1991. Later, she started her MBBS practice, professional degree in medicine, but left midway amidst of her father's killing in 1990 and subsequently joined politics.

During her political career, she served as a minister in several departments such as deputy minister for education in 1996, state minister for Social Welfare, and Public Works. Later, she was appointed as a minister of Tourism and served the department until 2002. In 2002, she lost election from her assembly constituency and was later nominated for Member of Legislative Council post by the party in 2004.

Controversies 
In 2014 state assembly election campaign, her alleged video clip which was heavenly circulated by the internet users across the social media networks caught news media attention forcing an old man from Kulgam district "to swear in the name of Allah" and to take auth of the quran to vote for her. Her video (election campaign) was reportedly considered a violation of Model Code of Conduct. National Congress, her party declined to accept the violation citing "there was absolutely nothing wrong with it". The clip was subsequently reported to the Election Commission of India by the opposition mainstream party, PDP.

References 

1970 births
Living people
Jammu & Kashmir National Conference politicians
People from Kulgam district
Women in Jammu and Kashmir politics
Members of the Jammu and Kashmir Legislative Council
Jammu and Kashmir MLAs 1996–2002
Jammu and Kashmir MLAs 2008–2014
State cabinet ministers of Jammu and Kashmir
20th-century Indian women
20th-century Indian people
21st-century Indian women politicians